Wix  is both an English surname and a given name. Notable people with the name include:

Given name
 Wix Garner (1897–1978), American college football coach
 Green Wix Unthank (1923–2013), American federal judge

Surname
 Don Wix (born 1946), American politician
 Edward Wix (1802–1866), British archdeacon
 Florence Wix (1883–1956), English-born American character actress 
 Henry Otto Wix (1866–1922), German-born American painter 
 Katy Wix (born 1980), British actress
 Samuel Wix (1771–1861), English cleric and controversialist

See also
 Paul "Wix" Wickens (born 1956), English keyboardist
 Wix (disambiguation)
 Wicks (surname)

English-language surnames
Masculine given names